George Crosbie (1864 – 28 November 1934) was an Irish politician. He was a Cumann na nGaedheal member of Seanad Éireann in 1931 and from 1932 to 1934, and the only person twice elected at by-elections to the Seanad. A journalist, he was an unsuccessful candidate at the 1925 Seanad election. He was elected at a by-election on 5 November 1931 to fill the vacancy caused by the death of Patrick Hooper. He lost his seat at the 1931 Seanad election but was elected at a by-election on 2 January 1932 to fill the vacancy caused by the resignation of Alfie Byrne. He died in office in November 1934.

References

1864 births
1934 deaths
Cumann na nGaedheal senators
Members of the 1928 Seanad
Members of the 1931 Seanad
People from County Cork